Puppet on a Chain is a 1970 British thriller film directed by Geoffrey Reeve and starring Sven-Bertil Taube, Barbara Parkins and Alexander Knox. It is based on the 1969 novel Puppet on a Chain by Alistair MacLean.

The story was Maclean's 14th and the seventh film adaption of a Maclean novel. The film's signature boat chase (8 minutes of screen time) along the canals of Amsterdam reportedly inspired the boat chase in the James Bond movie Live and Let Die two years later and in the 1988 thriller Amsterdamned, which would also feature a long canal boat chase. The boat chase was directed by an uncredited Don Sharp, who also did various reshoots for the film.

Plot
After three hippie drug-dealers are murdered by "the assassin" in a house in Los Angeles, the U.S. government sends special agent Paul Sherman to track down the Dutch source of heroin that is causing the drug war. On arriving at Amsterdam Schiphol Airport, Sherman witnesses an agent, Jimmy Duclos, who was there to meet him, shot dead by the assassin.

Sherman is originally from the Netherlands, but it is clear that Amsterdam's chief of police, Colonel De Graaf, is unhappy with having the Americans interfere in Dutch affairs. However, Sherman's direct contact, Inspector Van Gelder, is more cooperative, since his niece, Trudi, suffers from severe brain damage caused by a heroin overdose eight years earlier.

Sherman makes contact with a deep-cover agent from Washington named Maggie. Sherman is then followed around Amsterdam by the assassin, indicating that the drug dealers have someone on the inside. Sherman gets away from him and later confronts him in Sherman's hotel room, where Sherman accidentally kills him.

Sherman meets Duclos' girlfriend Astrid Lemay and her drug-addicted brother George. Soon after, George dies of an overdose and she is murdered. Sherman is attacked by a man on a boat and shoots him dead. Drug lord Meegeren, who had killed Astrid, then kills Maggie by hanging her from a chain (although in the book she is pitchforked to death by the Dutch women in the courtyard) and holds Sherman prisoner. Meegeren leaves on a speedboat. Sherman escapes and follows him on another speedboat. The chase ends with Meegeren accidentally crashing his boat and it being destroyed by fire.

Sherman and a colleague arrive at a warehouse (run by Morgenstern but without his partner Mugenthaler who only appears in the book) where the drugs are being distributed. There he meets Van Gelder and his niece. He finds out that they are part of the trafficking gang and that Trudi had been faking her mental disability. A shootout leaves Trudi dead and Sherman wounded. Van Gelder tries to escape, but is killed by Sherman (again a discrepancy in that he falls to his death in the film but is skewered on a hook in the book).

Cast

 Sven-Bertil Taube as Paul Sherman 
 Barbara Parkins as Maggie 
 Alexander Knox as Col. De Graaf 
 Patrick Allen as Insp. Van Gelder 
 Vladek Sheybal as Meegeren 
 Ania Marson as Astrid Lemay 
 Stewart F. Lane as George Lemay 
 Drewe Henley as Jimmy Duclos 
 Michael Mellinger as Hotel Manager
 Penny Casdagli as Trudi 
 Peter Hutchins as The Assassin 
 Henny Orri as Herta 
 Mark Malicz as  Morgenstern 
 Peter Brace as Thug
 Gerry Crampton as Thug
 Arnold Diamond as Coroner
 Joe Dunne as Barge-hold henchman
 Leon Eagles as Police Sgt at Station
 George Leech as Thug
 Fred Machon as Hotel Guest
 John More as Hotel Guest
 Paddy Smith as Bellboy
 Willem Sibbelee
 Jacques Luijer

Production

Alistair MacLean had formed a partnership with Geoffrey Reeves to make movies where MacLean would write and Reeves would direct. Reeves had been part of the development of Puppet on a Chain. The film was financed by the Big City company of Israel film producer Kurt Unger. MacLean wrote the script but Unger was unhappy and had it rewritten by Paul Wheeler which upset MacLean.

The film was shot on location in the Netherlands and at Shepperton Studios.

The famous boat chase sequence was performed by Wim Wagenaar and directed by Don Sharp who was specifically hired to do it over a four-week period. Once he completed that sequence he was hired by the producers to reshoot additional sequences, using a moviola of the original cut on set to enable footage to match. Sharp says the plot was adjusted, the ending changed, among many other adjustments. Sharp:
The chappie who directed originally [Geoffrey Reeve, who died in 2010] has gone on to produce some nice movies, and before this he had a good career in shooting commercials. And he’s a talented man. But he didn’t have a story sense then, as a director, and he and his camera operator, each set-up, you know, a sequence that looked like part of a television commercial and wasn’t there for the drama of it, or just to let the audience know what was happening. And therefore I had to take parts out of, for example, a nightclub sequence. Seventy-five per cent of it was fine; only when it came to the dialogue bits between them did I have to go in and reshoot it, because it just didn’t make sense – to shoot a couple of really good, important dialogue lines to do with the plot in a shot between the legs of a dancer . . . That wasn’t exactly it but I mean that sort of thing, you know. It was done for a visual effect.

Reception
Sharp said the film went on to make "a mint of money" and claimed in 2007 he was still getting royalties from it being shown on television.

The Monthly Film Bulletin called it a "singularly unappetising piece of work."

References

External links

 Review at Time Out London
Review of film by Roger Ebert
Review at AlistairMacLean.com
Review of film at Variety

1970 films
1970s chase films
1970s crime thriller films
British chase films
British crime thriller films
Films about heroin addiction
Films about murderers
Films about the illegal drug trade
Films based on British novels
Films based on crime novels
Films based on works by Alistair MacLean
Films directed by Geoffrey Reeve
Films set in Amsterdam
Films shot in the Netherlands
Films shot at Shepperton Studios
Films scored by Piero Piccioni
1970s English-language films
1970s British films